Mia vradia me tin Marinella no. 2 (Greek: Μια βραδιά με την Μαρινέλλα no. 2) is the name of the second live album by popular Greek singer Marinella. It was recorded at the nightclub "Marinella's" in Athens and was released on 6 April 1973 by PolyGram Records in Greece.

The album was re-issued on a double compilation album, together with the 1972 album Mia Vradia Me Tin Marinella, in 1988 by PolyGram. This compilation was released on a 2-CD set in the 1990s. 
In 2007, Universal Music Greece granted a licensed re-release to Athens-based Espresso newspaper for their Chrysi Diskothiki (Golden Record Library), the re-release contained the same tracks as the original compilation album.

Track listing 
Side One.
 "Drigi, drigi, mana mou (Velvet mornings)" (Ντρίγκι, ντρίγκι, μάνα μου; Drigi, drigi, my mother) – (Stélios Vlavianós - Robert Constandinos - Pythagoras) – 3:05
 "Ola ine tichera" (Όλα είναι τυχερά; It's all a matter of luck) – (Stavros Xarchakos - Nikos Gatsos) – 2:20
 "Apopse pou tha fygis anthrope mou" (Απόψε που θα φύγεις άνθρωπε μου; Tonight that you're leaving, my man) – (Marios Kostoglou - Ilias Lymperopoulos) – 4:01
 "To mantalo" (Το μάνταλο; The latch) – (Giorgos Katsaros - Pythagoras) – 2:04
 "Ti na thimitho, ti na xechaso" (Τι να θυμηθώ, τι να ξεχάσω; What to remember, what to forget) – (Apostolos Kaldaras - Pythagoras) – 1:49
 "Pame gia ypno Katerina" (Πάμε για ύπνο Κατερίνα; Let's go to sleep, Catherine) – (Giorgos Katsaros - Pythagoras) – 3:08
Side Two.
 "Palikari mou" (Παλικάρι μου; My gallant man) – (Stavros Xarchakos - Nikos Gatsos) – 3:07
 "An imoun plousios" (Αν ήμουν πλούσιος; If I were rich) – (Doros Georgiadis - Sotia Tsotou) – 3:26
 "Derbenterissa" (Ντερμπεντέρισσα; Straight talking woman) – (Vassilis Tsitsanis - Nikos Routsos) – 2:47
 "De me stefanonese" (Δε με στεφανώνεσαι; You don't marry me) – (Vassilis Tsitsanis) – 1:34
 "De simfonisame" (Δε συμφωνήσαμε; We weren't compatible) – (Giorgos Zampetas - Giannis Kalamitsis as Alexandros Kagiantas) – 2:48
 "Drigi, drigi, mana mou (Velvet mornings)" (Ντρίγκι, ντρίκι, μάνα μου; Drigi, drigi, my mother) – (Stélios Vlavianós - Robert Constandinos - Pythagoras) – 2:55

Personnel 
 Marinella - vocals
 Marios Kostoglou - vocals and background vocals on tracks 1, 2, 4, 5, 6, 10 and 12
 Philippos Papatheodorou - producer 
 Yiannis Smyrneos - recording engineer

References

1973 live albums
Greek-language albums
Marinella live albums
Universal Music Greece albums